= Miona, Virginia =

Unincorporated community in Virginia, United States

Coordinates: 37°58′19″N 75°34′38″W

Miona is an unincorporated community in Accomack County, Virginia, United States.
